Sir Ian Maurice Gray Prosser (born 5 July 1943) is a British businessman.

Prosser was born in Bath, England and educated at King Edward's School, Bath, Watford Grammar School for Boys and Birmingham University.

He retired in 2021 from positions of Chairman BP Pension Trustees PLC, Chairman Navy Army & Airforce Institute  and Chairman of Gamcare. He was Chairman & CEO of Bass PLC and latterly Chairman of InterContinental Hotels until his retirement in 2003. He is a former non-executive Deputy Chairman of BP Plc, having joined as a non-executive  Director in 1997 and retired on 15 April 2010. He was formerly senior independent director of GlaxoSmithkline, a non-executive director of The Boots Company , of Lloyds TSB. Hillshire brands ( formerely Sara Lee.) Chairman of the Aviva Staff Pension Scheme and Chairman of Navy,Army & Air Force Institute ( NAAFI ).

Prosser received his knighthood in the 1995 New Year Honours List.

Prosser was awarded an honorary DUniv by Birmingham University in 2001.

References

Sara Lee Corporation
GSK plc people
BP people
People educated at King Edward's School, Bath
People educated at Watford Grammar School for Boys
1943 births
Living people
British corporate directors
British chairpersons of corporations
Businesspeople awarded knighthoods
Knights Bachelor
Alumni of the University of Birmingham
InterContinental Hotels Group people